The Rt Revd Edward Harold Etheridge (1872–1954) was the 4th Bishop of St John's in what was then known as  Kaffraria and is now Mthatha.

Educated at Marlborough and Keble College, Oxford he was ordained in  1895. He began his career with curacies at Kensington and Slough before emigrating to begin missionary work in Mashonaland. Subsequently, the area's archdeacon and additionally an honorary canon of St Mary's Cathedral in Salisbury, Rhodesia (now Harare, Zimbabwe) he was elevated to the episcopate in 1923 and served his mainly rural diocese for twenty years, followed by a further seven as canon chancellor of the Anglican Diocese of Grahamstown. A "quiet, unassuming prelate devoted to his diocese", he died on 16 September 1954.

Notes 

1872 births
1954 deaths
20th-century Anglican Church of Southern Africa bishops
Alumni of Keble College, Oxford
Anglican archdeacons in Africa
Archdeacons of Mashonaland
Anglican bishops of St John's
People educated at Marlborough College